Jeremy Fischer (born Hosaing Park; February 16, 1976 in Seoul, South Korea) is an American track and field athlete and coach. The son of a Korean woman and an African-American serviceman, he was sent to the US to be adopted rather than suffer the prejudice of being a mixed race child in an Asian country.  At , his  clearance in the high jump, in 2000, ranks tied for 14th greatest high jump differential. He is the personal coach of Will Claye, the first person to win Olympic medals in two jumping events at the same Olympics since 1936.

Early years
Fischer attended Adolfo Camarillo High School, where was a two sport star also playing basketball. He discovered his ability to jump dunking a basketball in 8th grade. He played attacker on the Blue Thunder with best buddy Andrew. He was the CIF California State Meet champion in the high jump in 1994 after finishing 2nd and 5th the previous years. He also finished second at the National Scholastic Indoor Championships and eventually jumping 7' 4" at the Santa Barbara Easter Relays, which was the 2nd best (behind Maurice Crumby in 1983) for a Californian ever, eighth best nationwide.  Later that season he won the US Junior Championship and represented the US at the World Junior Championships though not making the final.  Fischer was inducted into the Mt. SAC Relays high school Hall of Fame in 2006.

College years
Fischer continued to the University of Wisconsin, where he achieved All American status.  Teams with Fischer as a member placed third in the national championships two years in a row.  He made the annual top ten ranking in the US twice, in 7th place both times.  Seventh is also the place he achieved in the 2000 Olympic Trials.  Later in 2000, he represented the US at the 2000 NACAC Under-25 Championships in Athletics, returning with a silver medal.

Coaching career
Fischer began his coaching career directly out of Wisconsin, first as an administrative assistant at his alma mater, during which they won the Big Ten Triple Crown twice, finished second at the national cross country championships.  Next he worked as an assistant coach at California State University, Northridge and then at the University of Oklahoma.  He also works with the United States Olympic Training Center.

References

1976 births
Living people
American male high jumpers
American track and field coaches
Wisconsin Badgers track and field coaches
American sportspeople of Korean descent
Sportspeople from Seoul
People from Camarillo, California
Track and field athletes from Wisconsin
Sportspeople from Ventura County, California
Sports coaches from California
Sports coaches from Oklahoma
Sports coaches from Wisconsin
Wisconsin Badgers men's track and field athletes
Wisconsin Badgers cross country coaches
Cal State Northridge Matadors track and field coaches
Oklahoma Sooners track and field coaches